Guerrant House, also known as Pilot House, is a historic home located at Pilot, Montgomery County, Virginia.  It was built in the mid- to late-19th century, and is a two-story frame double-pile center-passage dwelling with a hipped roof and two massive brick chimneys.  Also on the property are a contributing meat house and spring house.

It was listed on the National Register of Historic Places in 1989.

References

Houses on the National Register of Historic Places in Virginia
Houses in Montgomery County, Virginia
National Register of Historic Places in Montgomery County, Virginia